Has District was one of the  was one of the 36 districts of Albania, which were dissolved in July 2000 and replaced by 12 counties. It is in the north-east of the country, and its capital was Krumë.

Has District, besides the town of Krumë, comprised a number of villages,  Has is located in the border of Albania and Kosovo. The ethnographic region of Has is much wider than Has District, as the region extends beyond the Albania-Kosovo border to the gates of the Kosovo cities of Prizren and Gjakova.

Administrative divisions
The district consisted of the following municipalities:
Fajzë
Gjinaj
Golaj
Krumë

See also
Has of Prizren, region in Kosovo

Notes and references
Notes:

a. 

References:

Districts of Albania
Geography of Kukës County